Art and Illusion, A Study in the Psychology of Pictorial Representation, is a 1960 book of art theory and history by Ernst Gombrich, derived from the 1956 A. W. Mellon Lectures in the Fine Arts. The book had a wide impact in art history, but also in history (e.g. Carlo Ginzburg, who called it "splendid"), aesthetics (e.g. Nelson Goodman's Languages of Art), semiotics (Umberto Eco's Theory of Semiotics), and music psychology (Robert O. Gjerdingen's schema theory of Galant style music).

In Art and Illusion, Gombrich argues for the importance of "schemata" in analyzing works of art: he claims that artists can only learn to represent the external world by learning from previous artists, so representation is always done using stereotyped figures and methods.

References

Further reading
Woodfield, Richard. Gombrich on Art and Psychology. Manchester and New York: Manchester University Press, 1996. 271 pp. .
Trapp, J.B. E.H. Gombrich: A Bibliography. London, Phaidon 2000. 
Gombrich, E.H.J. & Eribon, D. Conversations on Art and Science. New York: Abrams 1993 (also published as: A Lifelong Interest.)
Onians J. (ed.). Sight & Insight. Essays in honour of E.H. Gombrich. London: Phaidon 1994
McGrath, Elizabeth.‘E. H. Gombrich’, Burlington Magazine, 144 (2002), 111–12
Carlo Ginzburg, ‘From Aby Warburg to E.H. Gombrich: A Problem of Method’, Clues, Myths, and the Historical Method, John and Anne C. Tedeschi, trans, Baltimore: The Johns Hopkins University Press, 1986, 17–59
Shone, Richard and Stonard, John-Paul, eds. The Books That Shaped Art History: From Gombrich and Greenberg to Alpers and Krauss. London: Thames & Hudson, 2013.

External links
Google Books

1960 non-fiction books
Art history books